Winburndale Dam is a concrete gravity dam on the Winburndale Rivulet in New South Wales. Its height is 22 metres (72 ft) and holds back 1,700 megalitres of water. The dam is situated within the Winburndale Nature Reserve,  East of Bathurst, New South Wales. There is no public access to the dam.

It is used to supply raw water to Bathurst for the watering of parks and industrial use.

History
After extensive and lengthy investigations of possible dam locations, construction of the Winburndale dam began in 1931. It was constructed using Unemployment Relief funds during the Great Depression. As part of the construction of Winburndale dam, a  gravity fed wood stave pipeline was built from the dam to Bathurst.

See also
 Ben Chifley Dam

References

Dams in New South Wales
Dams completed in 1934
Gravity dams
1934 establishments in Australia